The 25th Goya Awards were given on 13 February 2011 to honour the best in Spanish films of 2010. Black Bread (Pa negre) by Agustí Villaronga won nine awards, including Best Film and Best Director.

Nominees

Major awards

Other award nominees

Honorary Goya
Mario Camus

References

External links
Official site

25
2010 film awards
2010 in Spanish cinema
2011 in Madrid